The 1938–39 Scottish Districts season is a record of all the rugby union matches for Scotland's district teams.

History

Edinburgh District beat Glasgow District in the Inter-City match.

Results

Inter-City

Glasgow District: A. S. Nicolson (Hillhead HSFP), A. P. Fairlie (Shawlands F. P.), Robert Wilson Shaw (Glasgow HSFP), W. G. Biggart (Glasgow Academicals), J. M. Sinclair (Glasgow University), W.C.W. Murdoch (Hillhead HSFP), I. E. Dawson (Hillhead HSFP), J. D. Niven (Hillhead HSFP), I. Wilkie (Hillhead HSFP), R. C. Graham (Hillhead HSFP), Vivian Weston  (Kelvinside Academicals), J. L. McClure (Ayr), T. R. Graham (Hutchesons GSFP), Laurie Duff (Glasgow Academicals), J. Macdonald (Kelvinside Academicals)

Edinburgh District: George Roberts (Watsonians), John Craig (Heriots), D. T. Gollogly (Royal HSFP), A. A. S. Scott (Edinburgh Wanderers), William Renwick (Edinburgh Wanderers), A. Reid (Watsonians), Ernie Anderson (Stewart's College F. P.), Jake Borthwick (Stewart's College F. P.), G. W. Wilson (Watsonians), Ian Henderson (Edinburgh Academicals), David Deas (Watsonians), D. U. Dewar (Watsonians), G. H. Hendry (Watsonians), D. K. A. MacKenzie (Edinburgh Wanderers), George Gallie (Edinburgh Academicals)

Other Scottish matches

North of Scotland District: 

Midlands District:

North of Scotland District: 

South of Scotland District:

Rest of the West: 

Glasgow District:

Junior matches

South of Scotland District: 

Edinburgh District:

Trial matches

Blues Trial: 

Whites Trial:

Probables: 

Possibles:

English matches

No other District matches played.

International matches

No touring matches this season.

References

1938–39 in Scottish rugby union
Scottish Districts seasons